Weed the People: The Future of Legal Marijuana in America is a 2015 book written by Bruce Barcott and published by Time Books.

See also
 List of books about cannabis

References

Further reading
 
Kirkus Reviews

2015 non-fiction books
American books about cannabis
Business books
Cannabis in the United States
Non-fiction books about cannabis